Toxicoscordion brevibracteatum (syn. Zigadenus brevibracteatus) is a species of flowering plant known by the common name desert deathcamas. It is native to Baja California, Sonora, and California, where it grows in sandy desert habitat among creosote and Joshua trees.

Toxicoscordion brevibracteatum is a perennial wildflower growing from a brown or black bulb up to 4 centimeters long. The stem grows up to 50 or 60 centimeters long. The leaves are linear in shape, measuring up to 30 centimeters long by one wide. Most of the leaves are at the base of the stem and there may be a few reduced leaves above. The inflorescence is an open panicle of flowers at the tips of branches. The flowers are male or bisexual, with six cream-colored tepals. The fruit is a capsule 1 or 2 centimeters long.

References

External links
Calflora Database: Toxicoscordion brevibracteatum (Desert death camas)
 Jepson Manual eFlora (TJM2) treatment of Toxicoscordion brevibracteatum
UC Photos gallery —  Toxicoscordion brevibracteatum

brevibracteatum
Flora of California
Flora of Baja California
Flora of Sonora
Flora of the California desert regions
Natural history of the California chaparral and woodlands
Natural history of the Mojave Desert
Natural history of the Transverse Ranges
Plants described in 1908